Neocinnamomum (新樟属, xin zhang shu)  is a genus of flowering plants belonging to the family Lauraceae. They are evergreen shrubs or small trees, indigenous to Bhutan, China, India, Indonesia (Sumatra), Myanmar, Nepal, Thailand, and Vietnam.

Neocinnamomum require a warm and wet climate with no extremes of heat and cold. They occupy mid to high elevations and montane laurel forests.

Neocinnamomum leaves resemble those of true cinnamon (Cinnamomum) in possessing strongly three-veined blades, but they are arranged alternately rather than oppositely.
The flowers are very small and bisexual. The inflorescences are highly condensed, with poorly defined branching, their overall shape described as "glomerules". Pollination is by insects. The seeds are dispersed by birds, which eat the fruit which are berry-like drupes. The red fruits of N. caudatum are eaten by humans. The fruits are ellipsoid or globose (round). Some species also propagate vegetatively.

Neocinnamomum mekongense is a species that grows in the mountains north of Dali, China. It is popular with butterflies, which possibly are attracted by secretions from extrafloral nectaries.

It has been suggested that fossil flowers from the late Cretaceous of North America known as Neusenia tetrasporangi are a close match to Neocinnamomum, and phylogenetic analysis from living plants might also indicate that Neocinnamomum is one of the earliest surviving lineages of the Lauraceae.

Species.
 Neocinnamomum caudatum (Nees) Merrill
 Neocinnamomum delavayi (Lecomte) H.Liou
 Neocinnamomum fargesii (Lecomte) Kosterm.
 Neocinnamomum lecomtei H.Liou
 Neocinnamomum mekongense (Hand.-Mazz.) Kosterm.

References

Lauraceae genera
Indomalayan realm flora
Lauraceae